Hysteria is a feminist publication, a non-profit periodical and platform for feminist activism.

History

Launched in the summer of 2013 by a group of students from the School of Oriental and African Studies at the University of London, HYSTERIA aims to be a platform for radical creative discourse about feminism encompassing poetry, text and visual arts.

Hysteria is sold as a quarterly publication. Examples of themes from early publications were: 'BackLash'; 'Roles and Rules'; 'Antagonism' and 'Abjection'.

Hysteria can be purchased in London at Housmans, ICA and Foyles bookshops as well as internationally where it is available in thirteen countries with launches in Berlin, Paris and New York (2014 and 2015). Each issue has been crowd funded to cover basic printing costs.

References

External links
Official website

2013 establishments in the United Kingdom
Feminism in the United Kingdom
Feminist magazines
Magazines established in 2013
Magazines published in London